Abdur Rouf Chowdhury (1937-2007) was a Bangladesh Awami League politician and the former Member of Parliament from Dinajpur-1.

Life and career
Chowdhury was born on 28 December 1937. He completed his undergraduate from Dhaka University. He was a student leader during his studies, developing a friendship with Bangabandhu Sheikh Mujibur Rahman. It was on the instructions of Rahman that he went on to represent the student council of Dinajpur SN College.

Chowdhury was the founding general secretary of Greater Dinajpur (now Dinajpur-Thakurgaon-Panchgarh) District Bangladesh Chhatra League during the Pakistan period. He was elected to Parliament in 1996 from Dinajpur-1 as a Bangladesh Awami League candidate. He was the state minister for post and telecommunication in the First Sheikh Hasina Cabinet.

Death and Legacy
Chowdhury died on 21 October 2007 in Bochaganj upazila in Dinajpur district. His only son Khalid Mahmud Chowdhury is currently the Organizing Secretary of the Awami League and has been elected as a member of parliament for three consecutive terms in the Bangladesh government. He is currently serving as the State Minister of the Ministry of Shipping of the People's Republic of Bangladesh.

The Abdur Rouf Chowdhury Foundation was established to honor his philanthropic ideals and to continue his work in uplifting rural communities in Northern Bengal.

References

Awami League politicians
2007 deaths
7th Jatiya Sangsad members
State Ministers of Posts, Telecommunications and Information Technology
1946 births